"Nothing Can Stop Us" is a 1991 song by English band Saint Etienne, released as the third single from their debut album, Foxbase Alpha. It is the first release to feature Sarah Cracknell, who would continue to front the band from this release on. The single reached the number one spot on the American dance charts for one week. The song is based on a looped sample from Dusty Springfield's recording of "I Can't Wait Until I See My Baby's Face".

"Nothing Can Stop Us" was released as a double A side with "Speedwell". As such, "Speedwell" takes lead track duty on the remix 12" single with the Flying Mix and Project Mix. The American remixes were done by the Masters At Work team of Kenny "Dope" Gonzales and Little Louie Vega. The lyric was partly re-written for these mixes, and the changes were retained in subsequent live performances. In 1994, Saint Etienne produced a new version of the song for Kylie Minogue, which was released as a b-side on her single "Confide in Me".

Critical reception
Justin Chadwick from Albumism noted "the buoyant throwback soul" of the song, stating that it is an "indisputable highlight" from the Foxbase Alpha allbum. Larry Flick from Billboard wrote that the band "returns with a similar-sounding jam [like "Only Love Can Break Your Heart"]." He added, "In its original form, the tune is an endearing modern-pop gem. With a little (make that a lot) of help from remixers Louie Vega and Kenny Gonzalez, the track is now a hip deep-houser that should thrill club jocks upon impact." Davydd Chong from Music Week'''s RM Dance Update said it "sounds so familiar, so classic, that you first thought is that it's another cover version. The breathy vocals of Sarah Cracknell, the joyous strings, the impish guitar licks and the loving kiss of romantic optimism belong to the Northern soul era, but, no, it's a St Etienne original." Jim Wirth from NME noted that "it's funky, it's got flutes, and it's a totally awesome pop song. There's nothing even remotely ironic about that." Mark Frith from Smash Hits'' commented, "Their music is light and ambient but dancey with it. Vocals are breathy and euphoric."

Music video
There were two different music videos for "Nothing Can Stop Us". The original features the band driving and walking around central London with a late 60s movie style. The second version only featured the group utilizing the remixes done in a sixties-esque background setting.

Track listing

Charts

References

Saint Etienne (band) songs
1991 singles
Songs written by Bob Stanley (musician)
Songs written by Pete Wiggs
Kylie Minogue songs
1991 songs
Heavenly Recordings singles